Harold Jenkins may refer to:
Conway Twitty (Harold Lloyd Jenkins, 1933–1993), American rock'n'roll and country music singer
Harold Jenkins (footballer) (1902–1981), Welsh footballer
Harold Jenkins (Shakespeare scholar) (1909–2000)
Harold Jenkins (nightclub owner) (1890–1967)
Harold Jenkins, member of Sugarman Gang
Harold Jenkins, a major antagonist of the Netflix Original Series The Umbrella Academy

See also
Harry Jenkins (disambiguation)